The green-backed honeybird (Prodotiscus zambesiae), also known as the eastern green-backed honeyguide, green-backed honeyguide and slender-billed honeyguide, is a species of bird in the family Indicatoridae.

Range
It is found in Angola, Botswana, Democratic Republic of the Congo, Kenya, Malawi, Mozambique, Namibia, Tanzania, Zambia, and Zimbabwe.

References

External links
 (Slender-billed honeyguide = ) Green-backed honeyguide - Species text in The Atlas of Southern African Birds.

green-backed honeybird
Birds of Southern Africa
Birds of East Africa
green-backed honeybird
Taxonomy articles created by Polbot